San Pedro Curahuara 
is a location in the La Paz Department in Bolivia, capital of the province of Gualberto Villarroel Province.

References 

  Instituto Nacional de Estadistica de Bolivia  (INE)

Populated places in La Paz Department (Bolivia)